Cape Beck is a rounded, bare rock cape that forms the south end of Black Island in the Ross Archipelago. Named by New Zealand Geological Survey Antarctic Expedition (NZGSAE), 1958–59, for Mr. A.C. Beck, the leader of the sub-party of the expedition which explored the island. Beck examined the southeast coastline and visited this cape.

Headlands of the Ross Dependency
Black Island (Ross Archipelago)